Air Vice Marshal David Vaughan Carnegie,  (7 February 1897 – 3 August 1964) was a senior Royal Air Force commander during the Second World War and the post-war decade.

Early years
He was born in Leicester, the son of Aberdeen-born Congregational minister the Rev. Joseph Davidson Carnegie and his wife who was born Ella Gertrude Vaughan-Pryce. For many years afterwards his parents lived in Stamford, Lincolnshire. David Carnegie was educated at Wyggeston Grammar School in Leicester.

He was to marry Kathleen F Pugson in Florida in August 1942 and make their home in the new house he had built just before the war at Dundargue Castle near Fraserburgh. They had two daughters. After the war he described his hobbies as golf, fishing and restoring his castle home.

Flying boats
He began his flying career in the Royal Naval Air Service in 1917 and until the armistice served as a pilot in North Sea patrols. The RNAS became the Royal Air Force at the beginning of April 1918.

Following his wartime service he was awarded a permanent commission in the rank of Flying Officer (Aeroplane and Seaplane) in October 1919.

After serving in the Mediterranean with 202 and 267 Flying Boat Squadrons he spent three years on flying boat test and experimental duties with MAEE.

Far East Flight
Carnegie joined the Singapore-based RAF Far East Flight in May 1927 as captain of Supermarine Southampton II flying boat S1150 studying the feasibility of long-distance flights by flying boat to Australia and the Far East, He subsequently remained in Singapore until early 1930, amongst other things helping set up the Singapore Flying Club.

Calshot
In 1930–1931 Carnegie was Officer Commanding the sea plane training squadron at RAF Calshot on Southampton Water, the United Kingdom's main seaplane/flying boat development and training unit.

David Carnegie was able to maintain his involvement with flying boats and sea planes until promoted to headquarters in 1932.

Air Ministry
After passing through the Staff College in 1932 he was appointed to the Air Defence of Great Britain headquarters. From September 1936 he served in the Air Ministry's War Training Department until taking command of RAF Wittering in April 1938.

Wartime
With the outbreak of war in September 1939 he was immediately posted to Air Staff Fighter Command then in 1941 to Washington D.C. as Director of British Flying Training, a part of the RAF delegation. By war's end, 16,000 RAF aircrew had been trained in the United States. In September 1942 he was appointed Director of Flying Training at the Air Ministry. Late in the war he was appointed Acting Air Vice-Marshal then Air Commodore in 1946

Postwar
After his 1945 appointment as Air Force adviser to the UK High Commissioner in Ottawa he received the permanent appointment of Air Vice-Marshal on 1 January 1948 and served three more years, June 1948 to January 1951, as Air Officer Commanding No. 18 Group RAF Coastal Command and Senior Air Officer for Scotland. From January 1951 to February 1954 he served on secondment as the Chief of the Air Staff of the Royal New Zealand Air Force. In 1953, he was awarded the Queen Elizabeth II Coronation Medal.

David Carnegie was a member of The Queen's Bodyguard for Scotland.

Retirement
Following some years as British Oxygen's Air Liaison Officer he was appointed director of Burghley House, Stamford, Lincolnshire.

David Carnegie died at his home, Sibson House near Peterborough in August 1964, soon after taking up his Burghley House appointment, leaving a widow and two daughters.

References

External links
 Photograph of Air Marshal Carnegie and family
 Air of Authority – A History of RAF Organisation – Air Vice Marshal D V Carnegie

|-
 

|-
 

1897 births
1964 deaths
People educated at Wyggeston Grammar School for Boys
Commanders of the Order of the British Empire
Companions of the Order of the Bath
Recipients of the Air Force Cross (United Kingdom)
Royal Air Force air marshals of World War II
Royal Air Force personnel of World War I
Royal Naval Air Service personnel of World War I
Royal New Zealand Air Force air marshals
Military personnel from Leicester